The tribe Pezoporini is the sister clade of the tribe Platycercini that contains the broad-tailed parrots.

Taxonomy
The inclusion of the following taxon is based on the paper by Joseph et al. (2012).
 Genus Neophema
 Blue-winged parrot, Neophema chrysostoma
 Elegant parrot, Neophema elegans
 Rock parrot, Neophema petrophilla
 Orange-bellied parrot, Neophema chrysogaster
 Turquoise parrot, Neophema pulchella
 Scarlet-chested parrot, Neophema splendida
 Genus Neopsephotus - sometimes included in Neophema
 Bourke's parrot, Neopsephotus bourkii
 Genus Pezoporus
 Eastern ground parrot, Pezoporus wallicus
 Western ground parrot, Pezoporus flaviventris
 Night parrot, Pezoporus occidentalis

References